SAm-1 (South America-1) is an optical submarine communications cable. It started operations in 2000, connecting the United States, Puerto Rico, Brazil, Argentina, Chile, Peru and Guatemala.
In 2007, SAm-1 was extended to reach Ecuador and Colombia.

It has landing points in:

 Boca Raton, Florida, United States
 Isla Verde, Puerto Rico
 Fortaleza, Brazil
 Salvador, Bahia, Brazil
 Rio de Janeiro, Brazil
 Santos, São Paulo, Brazil
 Las Toninas, Argentina
 Valparaíso, Chile
 Arica, Chile
 Lurín District, Peru
 Máncora, Peru
 Puerto San José, Guatemala
 Puerto Barrios, Guatemala
 Salinas, Ecuador
 Barranquilla, Colombia

When approved in 2000, SAm-1 was to consist of four fiber pairs initially operating at 40 Gbit/s in a self-healing ring configuration, expandable to 48 channels at 10 Gbit/s each, for a total design capacity of 480 Gbit/s, and with multiple upgrade capability using dense wave division multiplexing up to 1.92 terabits per second.

References 

Submarine communications cables in the Caribbean Sea
Submarine communications cables in the Pacific Ocean
Submarine communications cables in the South Atlantic Ocean
2000 establishments in North America
2000 establishments in South America